The 2012–13 Quinnipiac Bobcats men's basketball team represented Quinnipiac University during the 2012–13 NCAA Division I men's basketball season. The Bobcats, led by sixth year head coach Tom Moore, played their home games at the TD Bank Sports Center  and were members of the Northeast Conference. They finished the season 15–16, 11–7 in NEC play to finish in a tie for fifth place. They lost in the quarterfinals of the Northeast Conference Basketball tournament to Long Island.

This was the Bobcats last year as a member of the NEC as they will join the Metro Atlantic Athletic Conference for the 2013–14 season.

Roster

Schedule

|-
!colspan=9| Regular season

|-
!colspan=9| 2013 Northeast Conference men's basketball tournament

References

Quinnipiac Bobcats men's basketball seasons
Quinnipiac
Quinnipiac Bobcats
Quinnipiac Bobcats